Albugnano is a comune (municipality) in the Province of Asti in the Italian region Piedmont, located about  east of Turin and about  northwest of Asti.

Albugnano borders the following municipalities: Aramengo, Berzano di San Pietro, Castelnuovo Don Bosco, Moncucco Torinese, Passerano Marmorito, and Pino d'Asti.

Main sights
Parish church of San Giacomo Maggiore (15th century), with a 19th-century façade.
Church of St. Peter (11th century)
Tower belvedere, named after a medieval watch tower destroyed in 1401.

The Vezzolano Abbey is located nearby.

References

Cities and towns in Piedmont